Farid Kamil bin Zahari (born 5 May 1981) is a Malaysian actor, director and screenplay writer. He is a well-known male model turned actor who has made a big reputation of himself as one of Malaysia's most famous actors since Rosyam Nor in the 1990s for several of his outstanding performances in drama series and movies alike.

Background
Farid Kamil was born in Alor Star, Kedah. He is the eldest son of five siblings to Dato' Dr. Zahari Che Dan and Datin Sharifah Bardah Syed Abdillah. His brother, Fadzil Zahari is also an actor. His other siblings were Anis Anwar, Azman Aizuddin and Nurnadiah.
 
Kamil graduated from Universiti Teknologi MARA with Bachelor's Degree (Hons.) in Performing Arts in 2010. He has also been one of the most fortunate actor as he was lucky enough to have been guided by in acting by known actor; Ahmad Yatim which had given him an edge as a method actor despite appearing in a number of comedy and commercial released films and dramas.

Career

Beginning
Kamil began his career in the entertainment industry as a model in 1999 to support his tuition fee - some of the companies he worked for during this early period were Dunhill, Pringles and TM Net. His involvement in the film industry however only began in 2000 when he was discovered by Abdul Razak Mohaideen, a very popular director during that time, and was cast as a minor character in his film; Mistik. Appearing in Mistik was a turning stone for Kamil as he began to catch the attention of local directors and film makers. In 2003, Kamil was cast alongside Erra Fazira in Cinta Kolestrol, playing her younger brother.

2004–2007: Rise to fame and major roles
By 2004, Kamil's popularity soared. He continued to appear not only in films alongside prominent names such as Erra Fazira in Hingga Hujung Nyawa and Kuliah Cinta in a supporting role and a leading man debut in a thriller movie titled Tujuh Perhentian . In the same year, Kamil also appeared alongside Datuk Siti Nurhaliza for a Hotlink advertisement campaign. The campaign itself helped Kamil to be recognised as well as becoming a fan favourite.

Kamil starred mainly in Abdul Razak's movies until 2006, where Kamil joined forces with a different director; Ahmad Idham in his movie Remp-It not only as the lead actor, but also the screenwriter, at the behest of the producer. The movie was a box office success and was followed by two sequels.

With his career on a roll, Kamil took one of his most challenging roles to date in 2008 when he appeared in Osman Ali's Anak Halal. His appearance in the movie as well as in Mamat Khalid's Kala Malam Bulan Mengambang made him one of the most sought actors during that time. Kamil was also recognised when he was nominated for Best Actor for his portrayal in Anak Halal and best supporting actor for his role in Kala Malam Bulan Mengambang in the 21st Malaysia Film Festival in 2008.

2010–present: Venture in directing 
In 2010, Farid was entrusted to direct the third and final movie in the Remp-It series. However, the movie snowballed bad publicity due to perceptions that it had glorified mat rempit culture which was very prevalent in TV dramas and movies at that time, much to the Government's chagrin. The movie was subsequently retitled V3-Samseng Jalanan.

Farid involved in two film productions in 2017: the first one is the action film J Revolusi while the other being Tombiruo: Penunggu Rimba, an adventure film adapted from a novel written by Ramlee Awang Murshid.

Personal life

Relationship
Kamil was romantically linked with a number of actresses. From his break-up with his then girlfriend Irma Hasmie some years ago, his alleged romantic entanglement with Lisa Surihani and the latest one being his courtship with starlet Diana Danielle. On 16 October, it was confirmed that he is engaged with Diana Danielle and the couple got married on 3 November 2012. They now have two children together, namely Muhammad and Nur Aurora.

Drug allegations and assaults
On 12 January 2018, Kamil was remanded for four days for investigations, after he allegedly slapped a policeman and kicked a member of the public. Authorities also ran a urine test, in which he tested positive for marijuana, according to the report.

Recognition
On 16 December 2017, Kamil, along with Singaporean actor Aaron Aziz (his co-star in Evolusi KL Drift film series) awarded by the Sultan of Pahang by carrying the title of Dato' in conjunction with Ahmad Shah of Pahang's birthday.
  :
  revoked 1 February 2021

Filmography

Film

Television series

Telemovie

Television

Theater

References

External links
 

Malaysian male actors
Malaysian male models
Living people
1981 births
Malaysian people of Malay descent
People from Kedah
Malaysian Muslims
21st-century Malaysian male actors